Slim Dusty has released 122 records (61 studio albums) in his career. 
By March 1976, Dusty had achieved 37 gold and two platinum records. By November 1979, this Dusty had amassed 63 gold and platinum albums.

In 2018, it was reported Dusty had sold more than seven million records and earned over 70 gold and platinum album certifications.

NB: Chart positions prior to 1970 are unknown. Certifications prior to 1990 are unknown.

Albums

Studio albums

Soundtrack albums

Live albums

Compilation albums
{| class="wikitable plainrowheaders" style="text-align:center;"
|+
! scope="col" rowspan="2" style="width:20em;" | Title
! scope="col" rowspan="2" style="width:20em;" | Album details
! scope="col" colspan="1" | Chart positions
! rowspan="2" style="width:12em;" | Certifications(sales thresholds)
|-
! scope="col" style="width:3em;font-size:90%;" | AUS
|-
! scope="row" | Encores
|
 Released: 1969
 Label: Columbia (330SX-9565)
| -
|
|-
! scope="row" | The Best of Slim Dusty
|
 Released: 1973
 Label: World Record Club (S-5359)
| -
|
|-
! scope="row" | Dusty Tracks
|
 Released: 1973
 Label: Axis (AXIS 6083)
 Tracks recorded between 1959 and 1967
| -
|
|-
! scope="row" | Dinki-Di Aussies
|
 Released: 1974
 Label: Axis (TC-AX-1095)
 Tracks recorded  between 1957 and 1969
| -
|
|-
! scope="row" | The Best of Slim Dusty Volume 2
|
 Released: 1975
 Label: Columbia (SCX-8021)  
| -
|
|-
! scope="row" | Way Out There
|
 Released: 1975
 Label: Axis 
 Tracks recorded  between 1957 and 1964  
| -
|
|-
! scope="row" | This Is Your Life
|
 Released: 1976
 Label: EMI (SCXA 8033)
| -
|
|-
! scope="row" | Songs from Down Under
|
 Released: 1976
 Label: Axis (TC-AX- 10306)
 Tracks recorded between 1959 and 1972
| -
|
|-
! scope="row" | Slim Dusty Sings His Favourite Songs
|
 Released: 1976
 Label: World Record Club (R-60533)
| -
|
|-
! scope="row" | Travelling Country Man
|
 Released: 1977
 Label: Axis (TC-AX- 10334)
 Tracks recorded between 1959 and 1973
| -
|
|-
! scope="row" | A Guitar and a Hat
|
 Released: February 1979
 Label: World Record Club (90544, C 90545, C 90546)
 3x Vinyl Box Set
| -
|
|-
! scope="row" | Rarities
|
 Released: 1979
 Label: EMI (SD.1)
 Tracks recorded between 1942 and 1945
| -
|
|-
! scope="row" | Rodeo Riders
|
 Released: 1979
 Label: Axis (6386)
 Tracks recorded between 1960 and 1977
| -
|
|-
! scope="row" | No. 50 The Golden Anniversary Album
|
 Released: April 1981
 Label: EMI Music (PLAY1004)
| 10
|
|-
! scope="row" | Slim Dusty ....Vintage Album 1
|
 Released: 1982
 Label: EMI/Columbia (TC 7998684)
| -
|
|-
! scope="row" | Slim Dusty ....Vintage Album 2
|
 Released: 1983
 Label: EMI/Columbia
| -
|
|-
! scope="row" | I Haven't Changed a Bit
|
 Released: 1983
 Label: Axis (AX-701306)
| -
|
|-
! scope="row" | The Best of Slim Dusty
|
 Released: 1984
 Label: EMI/ Reader's Digest (Oz-RD4-386)
 6× LP box set
| -
|
 ARIA: Gold
|-
! scope="row" | I'll Take Mine Country Style
|
 Released: 1985
 Label: Axis (AX-430027)
| -
|
|-
! scope="row" | Australia Is His Name
|
 Released: 1985
 Label: Thorn EMI
 3x LP Box Set (7946552)
| -
|
|-
! scope="row" | Slim Dusty ....Vintage Album 3
|
 Released: November 1986
 Label: EMI/Columbia
| -
|
|-
! scope="row" | Country Livin
|
 Released: 23 November 1987
 Label: Axis (AX 701372)
 Tracks recorded between 1957 and 1987
| -
|
|-
! scope="row" | The Heritage Album
|
 Released: 1988
 Label: Columbia (SCXO 790140)
 Tracks recorded between 1955 and 1987
| -
|
|-
! scope="row" | Slim Dusty Sings Stan Coster
|
 Released: 1988
 Label: Axis (AXIS 8377242)
 Tracks recorded between 1963 and 1978
| -
|
|-
! scope="row" | Slim Dusty ....Vintage Album 4
|
 Released: 1989
 Label: EMI/Columbia (OEX 793064)
| -
|
|-
! scope="row" |Henry Lawson and Banjo Paterson
|
 Released: March 1990
 Label: Columbia 
| -
|
|-
! scope="row" | Slim Dusty ....Vintage Album 5
|
 Released: January 1991
 Label: EMI/Columbia (OEX 795285)
| -
|
|-
! scope="row" | Slim Dusty Sings Joy McKean
|
 Released: October 1991
 Label: EMI/Columbia 
 Tracks recorded between 1962 and 1986
| -
|
|-
! scope="row" | Travellin' Guitar
|
 Released: February 1992
 Label: 
 Tracks recorded between 1958 and 1960
| -
|
|-
! scope="row" | A Land He Calls His Own
|
 Released: August 1992
 Label: EMI (251206-208)
 Tracks recorded between 1966 and 1987
 3x CD Box Set
| -
|
|-
! scope="row" | The Anniversary Album No. 2 (1943-1993)
|
 Released: December 1993
 Label: EMI (7896102)
| -
|
|-
! scope="row" | Regal Zonophone Collection
|
 Released: 16 October 1995
 Label: EMI 
 Tracks recorded between 1946 and 1957
 3xCD Set
| -
|
|-
! scope="row" | Country Classics
|
 Released: 1996
 Label: Reader's Digest (300701300)
 Tracks recorded between 1947 and 1995
 3xCD Set
| -
|
 ARIA: Gold
|-
! scope="row" | Old Time Drover's Lament
|
 Released: 1997
 Label: EMI 
 Tracks recorded between 1957 and 1970
| -
|
|-
! scope="row" | Down the Dusty Road
|
 Released: 1998
 Label: EMI (724381431627)
| -
|
|-
! scope="row" | Talk About The Good Times
|
 Released: 1998
 Label: EMI 
 Tracks recorded between 1960 and 1975
| -
|
|-
! scope="row" | The Very Best of Slim Dusty
|
 Released: November 1998
 Label: EMI (724349572829)
| 15
|
 ARIA: 5× Platinum
|-
! scope="row" | The Man Who Is Australia
|
 Released: July 2000
 Label: EMI (724352765321)
 5xCD Set
| 70
|
|-
! scope="row" | A Piece of Australia
|
 Released: 15 January 2001
 Label: EMI (724353107222)
| -
|
|-
! scope="row" | Pubs, Trucks & Plains
|
 Released: March 2007
 Label: EMI (094638953227)
 Tracks recorded between 1960 and 2002
 3×CD set
| 20
|
 ARIA: Gold
|-
! scope="row" | Reunion (credited to The Slim Dusty Family)
|
 Released: March 2008
 Label: EMI (5198462)
| 15
|
|-
! scope="row" | Sittin' On 80
|
 Released: July 2009
 Label: EMI (094638953227)
 Tracks recorded between 1969 and 2002
 4x CD Set
| 20
|
|-
! scope="row" | 1960's Classic Albums
|
 Released: 28 September 2012
 Label: EMI (7056652)
 5x CD Box Set
| -
|
|-
! scope="row" | 1970's Classic Albums
|
 Released: 28 September 2012
 Label: EMI (7056662)
 5x CD Box Set
| -
|
|-
! scope="row" | 1980's Classic Albums
|
 Released: 28 September 2012
 Label: EMI (7056672)
 5x CD Box Set
| -
|
|-
! scope="row" | 1990's Classic Albums
|
 Released: 28 September 2012
 Label: EMI (7056712)
 5x CD Box Set
| -
|
|-
! scope="row" | The Son of Noisy Dan: A Musical Autobiography
|
 Released: 16 August 2013
 Label: Universal Music (3747004)
| -
|
|-
! scope="row" | The Den Tapes
|
 Released: 13 November 2015
 Label: EMI (4736241)
 Recorded in the 1990s
| 27
|
|-
! scope="row" | Prime Movers
|
 Released: 15 July 2016
 Label: EMI (4788793)
| 43
|
|-
! scope="row" | Gone Fishin'''
|
 Released: 20 August 2021
 Label: EMI (3847882)
| 11
|
|-
! scope="row" | Christmas On the Station|
 Scheduled: 25 November 2022
 Label: EMI (4886132)
| 
|
|-
|colspan="20" style="font-size:90%"| "—" denotes a recording that did not chart, position unknown or was not released in that territory.
|}

Chronological list of all albums

 Slim Dusty Sings (1960)
 Songs for Rolling Stones (credited to Slim Dusty and His Bushlanders) (1961)
 Along the Road of Song (1962)
 Aussie Sing Song (credited to Slim Dusty and His Bushlanders) (1962)
 Another Aussie Sing Song (credited to Slim Dusty and His Bushlanders) (1963)
 Songs in the Saddle (1963)
 Songs of Australia (1964)
 People and Places (1964) (credited to Slim Dusty and His Bushlanders)
 Australian Bush Ballads (1965)
 The Nature of the Man (1966)
 An Evening with Slim and Joy (1966) (with Joy McKean) 
 Essentially Australian (1967)
 Songs My Father Sang to Me (1968)
 Songs from the Cattle Camps (1968)
 Sing Along with Dad (1968)  (with Joy McKean, Anne and David)
 Cattle Camp Crooner (1969)
 Slim Dusty Encores (1969)
 Sing a Happy Song (1970)
 Songs from the Land I Love (1971)
 Glory Bound Train (1971)
 Live at Wagga Wagga (1972)
 Me and My Guitar (1972)
 Foolin' Around (1973) (with Joy McKean)
 The Best of Slim Dusty (1973)
 Live at Tamworth (1973)
 Dusty Tracks (1973)
 Tall Stories and Sad Songs (1973)
 Australiana (1974)
 Dinki Di Aussies (1974)
 The Best of Slim Dusty Volume 2 (1975)
 Lights on the Hill (1975)
 Way Out There (1975)
 Things I See Around Me (1976) (featuring The Travelling Country Band)
 Give Me the Road (1976) (featuring The Travelling Country Band)
 This Is Your Life (1976)
 Songs from Down Under (1976)
 Slim Dusty Sings His Favourite Songs (1976)
 Just Slim with Old Friends (1977) (with Barry Thornton, Paul and Colleen Trenwith and Linsday Butler)
 On the Move (1977) (with The new Travelling Country Band)
 Travellin' Country Man (1977)
 To Whom It May Concern (1978)
 The Entertainer - Live at The Sydney Opera House (1978)
 A Guitar and a Hat (1979)
 Spirit of Australia (1979)
 Slim Dusty Rarities (1979)
 Rodeo Riders (1979)
 Walk a Country Mile (1979)
 The Man Who Steadies the Lead (1980)
 Slim Dusty Family Album (1980)
 No 50 - The Golden Anniversary Album (1981)
 Where Country Is (1981)
 Vintage Album Volume 1 (1981)
 Who's Riding Old Harlequin Now (with The Travelling Country Band) (1981)
 Vintage Album Volume 2 (1982)
 On the Wallaby (1983)
 I Haven't Changed a Bit (1983)
 Trucks on the Track (1983)
 Slim Dusty Movie  (Soundtrack)  (1984)
 The Best of Slim Dusty (1984)
 I'll Take Mine Country Style (1985)
 Singer from Down Under (1985)
 To a Mate (1985)
 Australia Is His Name (1985)
 Stories I Wanted to Tell (1986)
 Vintage Album Volume 3 (1986)
 Beer Drinking Songs of Australia (1986)
 Cattlemen from the High Plains (1987)
 Neon City (1987)
 Country Livin (1987)
 The Heritage Album (1988)
 Slim Dusty Sings Stan Coster (1988)
 G'day G'day! (1988)
 King of Kalgoorlie (1989)
 Vintage Album Volume 4 (1989)
 Two Singers One Song(with Anne Kirkpatrick) (1989)
 Henry Lawson and Banjo Paterson (1990)
 Coming Home (1990)
 Slim Dusty Sings Joy McKean (1991)
 Vintage Album Volume 5 (1991)
 A Land He Calls Our Own (1992)
 Live Into the '90s (1992)
 Travellin' Guitar (1992)
 That's the Song We're Singing (1992)
 Ringer from the Top End (1993)
 The Anniversary Album No. 2 (1943-1993) (1993)
 Natural High (1994)
 Country Way of Life (1995)
 Regal Zonophone Collection (1995)
 The Slim Dusty Show (Live in Townsville 1956) (1996)
 Country Classics (1996)
 91 Over 50 (1996)
 A Time to Remember (1997)
 Talk About the Good Times (1997)
 Old Time Drover's Lament (1997)
 Makin' a Mile (1997) 
 Down the Dusty Road (1998)
 The Very Best of Slim Dusty (1998)
 West of Winton (1999)
 Nighty Night <small> (aka 99)</small> (1999)
 Looking Forward Looking Back (2000)
 The Man Who Is Australia (2000)
 A Piece of Australia (2000)
 Ramblin' Shoes 1953-1976 (2000)
 Ramblin' Shoes Vol.2 1980-2000 (2000)
 The Men From Nulla Nulla (with Shorty Ranger) (2001)
 Travellin' Still...Always Will (with Anne Kirkpatrick) (2002)
 Columbia Lane - the Last Sessions (2004)
 Slim Dusty Live  (aka Live)(2006)
 Pubs, Trucks & Plains (2007)
 Reunion (credited to The Slim Dusty Family) (2008)
 Sittin' On 80 (2009)
 I've Been There And Back Again (2011)
 1960's Classic Albums (2012)
 1970's Classic Albums (2012)
 1980's Classic Albums (2012)
 1990's Classic Albums (2012)
 The Son of Noisy Dan: A Musical Autobiography (2013)
 The Den Tapes (2015)
 Prime Movers (2016)
 Slim and I (Soundtrack) (credited to Slim Dusty and various artists)  (2020)
 Gone Fishin' (2021)
 Christmas On the Station'' (2022)

Charting singles
During his career, Dusty had five top 40 hits on the Australian charts, with "A Pub With No Beer" and "Duncan" both reaching number one in 1958 and 1980 respectively.

References

Country music discographies
Discographies of Australian artists